Krishnagiri is a Lok Sabha (Parliament of India) constituency in Tamil Nadu. Its Tamil Nadu Parliamentary Constituency number is 9 of 39.

Assembly segments

2009–present

Before 2009
Hosur
Thalli
Kaveripattinam (defunct)
Krishnagiri
Bargur
Palacode (moved to Dharmapuri constituency after 2009)

Members of Parliament

Election results

General Election 2019

General Election 2014

General Election 2009

General Election 2004

References

External links
https://web.archive.org/web/20081218010942/http://www.eci.gov.in/StatisticalReports/ElectionStatistics.asp
Krishnagiri lok sabha  constituency election 2019 date and schedule

See also
 Election Commission of India
 Krishnagiri
 List of Constituencies of the Lok Sabha

Lok Sabha constituencies in Tamil Nadu